Joel Yancey (October 21, 1773 – April 1838) was a United States representative from Kentucky. He was born in Albemarle County, Virginia. Later, he moved to Kentucky. He owned slaves. Yancey was a member of the Kentucky House of Representatives 1809-1811. He also served in the Kentucky Senate 1816-1820 and 1824-1827.

Yancey was elected as a Jacksonian to the Twentieth and Twenty-first Congresses (March 4, 1827 – March 3, 1831). While in Congress, he served as chairman, Committee on Expenditures in the Post Office Department (Twenty-first Congress). He was an unsuccessful candidate for reelection in 1830 to the Twenty-second Congress. Yancey died in Barren County, Kentucky in April 1838 and was buried in that county.

References

1773 births
1838 deaths
People from Albemarle County, Virginia
Virginia colonial people
American people of Welsh descent
Jacksonian members of the United States House of Representatives from Kentucky
Members of the Kentucky House of Representatives
Kentucky state senators
American slave owners